"Here (In Your Arms)" is the lead single from Hellogoodbye's debut album, Zombies! Aliens! Vampires! Dinosaurs! (2006), released on August 8, 2006. The song peaked at number fourteen on the Billboard Hot 100 and was certified platinum in the United States. The song was released in the United Kingdom on April 13, 2007, peaking at number four on the UK Singles Chart. It also entered the top 10 in Ireland, the Netherlands, and Sweden.

Music video
The video is set at Camp Holadios, a fictional summer camp. While the band members are all staying there, Forrest becomes interested in a girl who is also at camp. The campers play with pogs. The video is also reminiscent of the film Wet Hot American Summer. One of the references to this movie is when Forrest puts on the headband and sunglasses similar to the change that "Coop" undergoes to win the affection of a girl with the same name, "Katie". Chewing gum is another major reference, where campers in the film are seen chewing gum before they kiss. The camp name "HOLADIOS", written in all capital letters on the sign seen at the beginning and end of the video, can be read as HOLA'ADIOS, which is "Hellogoodbye" in Spanish, but the campers at the end of video are seen wearing t-shirts with the capitalization written as "HolaDios" which is Spanish for HelloGod. Below the camp's name on the sign it states "Summer of 91' ".

Track listings

UK CD1 and European CD single
 "Here (In Your Arms)" (radio edit) – 3:39
 "Dear Jamie... Sincerely Me" (live) – 4:21

UK CD2
 "Here (In Your Arms)" (album version) – 4:01
 "Dear Jamie... Sincerely Me" (Young Americans remix) – 5:20
 "Here (In Your Arms)" (club mix) – 3:08

UK 7-inch picture disc
A. "Here (In Your Arms)" (radio edit)
B. "Baby, It's Fact" (live)

Australian CD single
 "Here (In Your Arms)" (radio edit)
 "Homewrecker"
 "Here (In Your Arms)" (live video)

Charts

Weekly charts

Year-end charts

Certifications

Cover versions

On numerous occasions during live shows, the band substitutes the second verse of the song with the first two verses of "Digital Love" by Daft Punk.

British DJ Chris Moyles performed a parody of the song called "Beer in Your Arms" on his show on BBC Radio 1 in the United Kingdom.

South African singer Nicholis Louw recorded an Afrikaans version, "Hier Naby Jou" (Here Close to You).

Wizard rock band Ministry of Magic also recorded a filk of the song, titled "Here in Your Car", about Harry Potter and Ron Weasley's friendship as they are flying from London to Hogwarts in the Weasleys' enchanted blue Ford Anglia.

References

2006 singles
2006 songs
Hellogoodbye songs